Queen Matilda may refer to:

 Matilda (877–968), Saint Matilda, Queen of Eastern Francia.
 Matilda of Frisia (died 1044), Queen of the Franks, wife of Henry I, King of the Franks
 Matilda of Flanders (c. 1031–1083), Queen of the English, wife of William the Conqueror
 Matilda of Scotland (c. 1080–1118, Queen of the English, wife of Henry I
 Empress Matilda (c. 1102–1167), Matilda of England, Holy Roman Empress, Queen of Germany, claimant to throne of England
 Matilda of Boulogne (c. 1105–1152), Queen of the English, wife of King Stephen
 Maud of Savoy (1125–1158), Queen of Portugal. wife of Afonso I
 Matilda of Savoy (1390–1438), Queen of Portugal, wife of Elector Palatine Louis III
 Maud of Wales or Matilda of Wales (1869–1938), Queen of Norway, wife of King Haakon VII
 Queen Mathilde of Belgium (born 1973), Mathilde d'Udekem d'Acoz, wife of King Philippe